Joseline Stefania Rivas López (born 14 January 1994) is a Salvadoran footballer who plays as a midfielder for Santa Tecla FC and the El Salvador women's national team.

Club career
Rivas has played for Santa Tecla FC in El Salvador.

See also
List of El Salvador women's international footballers

References

1994 births
Living people
Salvadoran women's footballers
Women's association football midfielders
El Salvador women's international footballers